is a Japanese singer, actor and essayist. Tone also covers children's songs under the pseudonym Hanako Nohara. Tone sings in Japanese and, to a limited extent, in English.

One of her songs titled "Derringer" became an opening theme to anime series Cat's Eye.

Personal life
Since September 2004, Tone has been married to Hiroshi Hirose, a hair stylist.

Discography

Albums
1985: WITTY 
1985: PURPLE ROSE
1986: Naturally
1987: JUST MY TONE
1987: FOR YOU…  (No. 75 JP)
1988: PURELY 
1990: Vois d L'ame (No. 96 JP)
1991: TRUE LOVE 
1993: TRENTAINE

Compilation albums
1985: Mariko Brand
1986:  LADY M -MARIKO BEST-
1988: Mariko Brand II Ballad Collection
1989: DANCE MIX
1989: BALLAD MIX
1990: 刀根麻理子ベストセレクション (Tone Mariko Best Collection)
2004: ゴールデン☆ベスト (Golden☆Best)

References

1962 births
Living people
People from Kawasaki, Kanagawa
Japanese actresses
Japanese women pop singers
Japanese electro musicians
English-language singers from Japan
Japanese women composers
Musicians from Kanagawa Prefecture
20th-century Japanese women singers
20th-century Japanese singers